Ellis Chibuye (born January 14, 1980) is a Zambian boxer.

He was born in Ndola. He participated in the 2004 Summer Olympics for his native African country. There he was stopped in the first round of the Welterweight (69 kg) division by Turkey's Bülent Ulusoy.

Chibuye qualified for the 2004 Athens Games by ending up in second place at the 2nd AIBA African 2004 Olympic Qualifying Tournament in Gaborone, Botswana. In the final he was defeated by Uganda's Sadat Tebazaalwa.

Chibuye won the bronze medal in the same division one year earlier, at the All-Africa Games in Abuja, Nigeria.

References

1980 births
Living people
Welterweight boxers
Boxers at the 2000 Summer Olympics
Boxers at the 2004 Summer Olympics
Olympic boxers of Zambia
Boxers at the 2006 Commonwealth Games
Commonwealth Games competitors for Zambia
People from Ndola
Zambian male boxers
African Games bronze medalists for Zambia
African Games medalists in boxing
Competitors at the 2003 All-Africa Games